The Rochester Open was a men's and women's grass court tennis tournament founded in 1881 as the Paddock LTC Open. It was organised by the Paddock Lawn Tennis Club, and played at The Paddock, King's School, Rochester, Kent, England. The tournament ran till 1924.

History
The Rochester Open tournament was founded in 1881. The tournament was organised by the Paddock Lawn Tennis Club, and was played at The Paddock, King's School, Rochester, Kent, England until 1924. The Paddock is the cricket square for King's School Rochester.

Location
Rochester is a town in Medway, in Kent, England. It is located about 30 miles (50 km) from London. The town forms a conurbation with neighbouring towns Chatham, Rainham, Strood and Gillingham.

Finals

Mens Singles

(incomplete roll)
 1881— H. Blatherwick d. ?
 1882― A. Buchanan d.  E. Welchman, 6–1, 6–4, 6–0
 1885— C.C.J. Perry d.  E.M. Lachlan, 6–1, 6–2, 3–6, 6–2
 1886— David Elgar Payn d.  Alfred E. Walker, 8–4, 6–4, 6–3
 1887— Charles Gladstone Eames d.  Harry T. Shapley, 6–2, 6–2
 1888— Charles Gladstone Eames d.  Wilfred Baddeley, 6–3, 6–4
 1893— Wilberforce Eaves d.  Roy Allen 7–5, 4–6, 6–3.
 1894— Wilberforce Eaves d.  Oscar William Benwell, 6–2, 6–1
 1905— Nigel George Davidson d.  Charles Gladstone Eames, 9–7, 6–2
 1908— William Alfred Ingram d.  Allan Campbell Pearson, 6–3, 11–9
 1909— Roderick James McNair d.  D.H. Lindsay, 6–0, 6–2
 1910— Evan Horace Lownds d.  R.P. Scott, 5–7, 7–5, 6–2.

Womens Singles
(incomplete roll)

 1904— Mildred Coles d.  Mrs H. Paine, 6–1, 6–2
 1905— Mildred Coles (2) d.  Mrs H. Paine, 6–2, 6–1
 1906— Mildred Coles (3) d.  Mildred Brooksmith, 6–4, 7–5
 1907— Mildred Coles (4) d. ] Miss Stagg, 6–3, 6–1
 1908— Mildred Brooksmith d. ] Mrs H.E. Munro, 6–3, 6–0
 1909— Winifred McNair d.  Mildred Coles, 6–0, 6–2
 1910— Mildred Brooksmith (2) d.  Norah Lattey, 6–1, 6–2
 1911— Mildred Brooksmith (3) and  Miss Harrison (divided title)
 1912— Mrs Spoor d.  Norah Lattey, 6–4, 6–1
 1913— Phyllis Carr Satterthwaite d.  B. Pennycuick, 6–2, 6–0
 1920— M. Scott d.  E. Tighe, 7–9, 8–6, 6–3
 1921— Phyllis Carr Satterthwaite (2) d.  Mrs Graham, 6–0, 6–1
 1922— Mildred Coles (5) d.  E. Tighe, 8–6 6–2
 1924— Mildred Coles (6) d.  Mrs E. Orde, 6–1, 6–3

References

Defunct tennis tournaments in the United Kingdom
Grass court tennis tournaments